Cafe Ice Cream Yonk (Hebrew: קפה גלידה יונק), founded in 1948, is one of Israel's oldest restaurants, located in Haifa. While the name implies otherwise, it is a Romanian grill. The restaurant is located at Kibbutz Galuyot Street 23, adjacent to the Haifa Flea Market on the same street. Their flagship dish is the Romanian kebab.

History 
The restaurant was founded in 1948 as a tiny ice cream and popsicle factory, by Yehuda "Yonk" and Yocheved Milstein, who had arrived from Poland. In the back of their factory Romanians from the neighborhood operated a little grill. Impressed by the potential, the Milsteins changed their tiny factory into a Romanian restaurant, serving the cuisine they had learned from the tenants. After Yehuda Milstein's death, the restaurant was continued and perfected by his son-in-law. In 2019 it is managed by the third generation of the founding family.

References

External links
 Official website

Restaurants in Haifa
Restaurants established in 1948
1948 establishments in Israel
Romanian restaurants
Ice cream brands
Romanian-Jewish culture in Israel